The General Directorate of Border Guard is a Saudi agency responsible for guarding land and sea borders of the Kingdom. Awwad Eid Al-Aradi Al-Balawi is the Directorate general of Saudi Arabian Border Guards.

History 
The late King Abdulaziz Al Saud laid the foundation of the organs of the state. In 10/7/1331.H (14 June 1913) The late king was preoccupied and first concerned about the formation and setting up land and maritime patrols and surveillance centres in the Eastern region. The patrols and the centres were consisting of small sailing boats that sail along the coast supported by land patrols on camel’s back to watch the land.

In 1344 H, (c.1925) the core of the Coast Guard Authority was established in Jeddah and it was tasked with organizing the duties, roles and responsibilities of patrols, seaports and harbors. In 1347 H, (c.1928) the work of the patrols, seaports and harbors in Jeddah was unified under one leadership, which was "Coast Guard"; and its work was limited to the Red Sea coast. Coast Guard was entitled to carry out its duties on foot or on camels back, these patrols were tasked with inspecting wild land and seizing contraband items.  The sea patrols were tasked with monitoring the coast within the territorial waters of the Kingdom by means of primitive boats. In 1353 H, (c.1934) the codes and regulations governing "The Coast Guard Authority” were issued, including all the provisions related to the roles,  responsibilities and duties carried out by Coast Guard; under theses  governing codes and  regulations, the Coast Guard Authority  was placed under the leadership  of the Ministry of Interior.

In 1355 H, (c.1936) the Coast Guard Authority was established in the Eastern region. In 1382 H, (c.1963) the Frontier Forces were established and both Eastern and Jeddah Coast Guard authorities were integrated under the name of "the General Directorate of Frontier Forces, Ports and Coast Guard". A royal decree No. M / 26, dated 24/6/1394 H (15 July 1974) was issued approving the governing regulations of border security Code as per Cabinet Resolution No. 923, dated 19/6/1394 H the name was changed to be the  "General Directorate of  Frontier Forces". In 1399 H, the Minister of Interior passed a decision No. 2S/ 7074, dated 26/9/1399 H, (19 Aug 1979) by reassigning the duties and responsibilities carried out by Border Guard; to watch, control and protect all seaports in the Kingdom instead of the General Directorate of Public Security. The  Minister of Interior passed decision No. 85/5/SH, dated 1/8/1412 H, (5 Feb 1992) amending the executive regulations governing Border Security code A royal decree No. M/9, dated 16/7/1414 H, (29 Dec 1993) was issued approving Cabinet Resolution No. 76, dated 14/7/1414 H (27 Dec 1993) amending  the name of the "General Directorate Frontier Forces" to be "General Directorate of Border Guard".

Regions 
Affiliated to the General Directorate of Border Guard a total number of nine commands  as follows: 
Border Guard Command in Makkah Region
Border Guard Command in Al-Madinah Region
Border Guard Command in the Eastern Region
Border Guard Command in Al-Jouf  Region
Border Guard Command in Najran Region
Border Guard Command in Jazan Region
Border Guard Command in Northern Region
Border Guard Command in Tabouk Region
Border Guard Command in Aseer Region

References

External links

 Saudi Arabian Border Guards official Page

1913 establishments in Asia
Saudi
Military of Saudi Arabia
Law enforcement in Saudi Arabia
Military units and formations established in 1913